Varden Tsulukidze (1865 – 19 May 1923) was a Georgian military commander and anti-Soviet resistance leader.

Biography 
By birth member of an old House of Tsulukidze, Varden served in the Imperial Russian army and was promoted to the rank of major-general in World War I. He then commanded a brigade in a newly independent Democratic Republic of Georgia after whose fall to the Soviets (1921) he became one of the leaders of an underground independence movement. Tsulukidze was arrested by the Cheka along with his associates and shot at the outskirts of Tbilisi on 19 May 1923.

References 

1865 births
1923 deaths
Generals from Georgia (country)
Nationalists from Georgia (country)
Nobility of Georgia (country)
Imperial Russian Army generals
Georgian generals in the Imperial Russian Army
Georgian major generals (Imperial Russia)

People from Georgia (country) executed by the Soviet Union
People of World War I from Georgia (country)